The Girls' doubles tournament of the 2006 BWF World Junior Championships is a badminton world junior individual championships for the Eye Level Cups, held on November 6–11. The defending champion of the last edition were Tian Qing and Yu Yang from China. The Chinese pair Ma Jin and Wang Xiaoli won the gold medal in this event after beat Hong Soo-jung and Sun In-jang of South Korea in straight games with the score 21–13, 21–18.

Seeded 

 Ma Jin / Wang Xiaoli (champion)
 Wang Siyun / Liao Jingmei (semi-final)
 Lily Siswanti / Richi Puspita Dili (second round)
 Hsieh Pei-chen / Lee Tai-an (quarter-final)
 Danielle Barry / Emma Rodgers (second round)
 Chanida Julrattanamanee / Ancheera Kittitharakul (third round)
 Erica Pong / Victoria Na (second round)
 Gabrielle White / Mariana Agathangelou (third round)

Draw

Finals

Top half

Section 1

Section 2

Bottom half

Section 3

Section 4

References

External links 
 Tournament Draw at www.koreabadminton.org

2006 BWF World Junior Championships
2006 in youth sport